Lundey may refer to any one of three Icelandic islands:

Lundey Island near Reykjavík, in southwestern Iceland
Lundey Island on Skagafjörður, in northwestern Iceland
Lundey Island on Skjálfandi Bay, in northeastern Iceland

See also
 Lundy (disambiguation)